The 1999 Labatt Brier was held from March 6 to 14 at Skyreach Centre in Edmonton, Alberta. Jeff Stoughton of Manitoba defeated Guy Hemmings of Quebec in the final.

Teams
{| border=1 cellpadding=5 cellspacing=0 
!bgcolor=#0033ff width=200|
!bgcolor=#0099ff width=200|British Columbia
!bgcolor=#ffff99 width=200|Manitoba
|- 
|Ottewell CC, Edmonton
Skip: Ken Hunka
Third: Brent MacDonald
Second: Blake MacDonald
Lead: Wade Johnston
Fifth: Jules Owchar
|Kelowna CC, Kelowna
Skip: Bert Gretzinger 
Third: Bob Ursel
Second: Mark Whittle
Lead: Dave Mellof
Fifth: David Stephenson
|Charleswood CC, Winnipeg
Skip: Jeff Stoughton 
Third: Jon Mead
Second: Garry Van Den Berghe 
Lead: Doug Armstrong 
Fifth: Steve Gould
|- border=1 cellpadding=5 cellspacing=0
!bgcolor=#ffff33 width=200|New Brunswick
!bgcolor=#ff5577 width=200|Newfoundland and Labrador
!bgcolor=#00CC66 width=200|Northern Ontario
|- 
|Beaver CC, Moncton
Skip: Russ Howard
Third: Wayne Tallon
Second: Rick Perron
Lead: Grant Odishaw
Fifth: Jeff Lacey
|St. John's CC, St. John's
Skip: Glenn Goss
Third: Glenn Turpin
Second: Ken Peddigrew
Lead: Brett Reynolds
Fifth: Geoff Cunningham
|North Bay Granite Club, North Bay
Skip: Scott Patterson   
Third: Phil Loevenmark
Second: John McClelland
Lead: Wayne Lowe
Fifth: Gilles Allaire 
|- border=1 cellpadding=5 cellspacing=0
!bgcolor=#cc99ee width=200|Nova Scotia
!bgcolor=#ff7777 width=200|Ontario
!bgcolor=#009900 width=200|Prince Edward Island
|- 
|Mayflower CC, Halifax
Skip: Paul Flemming
Third: Blayne Iskiw
Second: Andrew Dauphinee
Lead: Tom Fetterly
Fifth: Peter Eddy 
|Rideau CC, OttawaSkip: Rich Moffatt 
Third: Howard Rajala 
Second: Chris Fulton 
Lead: Paul Madden
Fifth: Brian Lewis 
|Charlottetown CC, CharlottetownSkip: Robert Campbell 
Third: Peter Gallant
Second: Mark O'Rourke
Lead: Mark Butler
Fifth: David Campbell|- border=1 cellpadding=5 cellspacing=0
!bgcolor=#00ffff width=200|Quebec 
!bgcolor=#33cc00 width=200|Saskatchewan
!bgcolor=#cccccc width=200|Yukon/Northwest Territories
|- 
|CC Saint-Lambert & Tracy, Saint-Lambert Skip: Guy Hemmings 
Third: Pierre Charette 
Second: Guy Thibaudeau 
Lead: Dale Ness 
Fifth: Dwayne Fowler 
|Yorkton CC, YorktonSkip: Gerald Shymko
Third: Gerry Adam
Second: Arnie Geisler
Lead: Neil Cursons
Fifth: Steve Sobkow 
|Whitehorse CC, WhitehorseSkip: Orest Peech 
Third: Pat Paslawski 
Second: Brian Wasnea 
Lead: Don Irwin 
Alternate: Lonnie Kofoed|}

Round-robin standings

Round-robin results
Draw 1

Draw 2

Draw 3

Draw 4

Draw 5

Draw 6

Draw 7

Draw 8

Draw 9

Draw 10

Draw 11

Draw 12

Draw 13

Draw 14

Draw 15

Draw 16

Draw 17

Tiebreaker

Playoffs

3 vs. 4

1 vs. 2

Semifinal

Final

Statistics
Top 5 player percentagesRound Robin onlyTeam percentagesRound Robin only''

References

The Brier
Curling competitions in Edmonton
Labatt Brier
1999 in Alberta